Bendigo Base Hospital is the major hospital of Bendigo, Victoria, Australia. It is operated by Bendigo Health Care Group (commonly known as Bendigo Health). The hospital is the largest regional hospital in Victoria and one of the largest public hospitals in Australia with a total of 734 beds. As of 2019, the hospital employs around 4,000 staff and provides a wide range of services to a catchment area covering one-fourth of the size of Victoria state.

History 
In 1853, it was established as the Bendigo Gold District General Hospital.

Campuses 
The hospital consists of three major campuses in Bendigo, with many services extended to regional Victoria such as Mildura, Echuca, Swan Hill, Kyneton and Castlemaine. The main campus encompasses all acute medical beds, an intensive care unit, an emergency department, an acute psychiatric ward (the Alexander Bayne Centre) and an outpatients unit. The Anne Caudle Centre includes rehabilitation, geriatric rehabilitation and aged care beds. The Stella Anderson Nursing Home is a high level nursing home and the Primary Care Clinic is one of the only two bulk billing general practices in Bendigo.

Services and specialties provided

Medical specialities
 General medicine
 Endocrinology
 Gastroenterology
 Geriatric medicine
 Respiratory medicine
 Rehabilitation medicine
 Nephrology
 Cardiology
 Coronary care unit
 Renal dialysis unit
 Oncology
 Palliative care

Surgical specialities
 General surgery
 Orthopedic surgery
 Vascular surgery
 Thoracic surgery
 Plastic surgery 
 Maxillofacial surgery
 Urology
 Ophthalmology
 Anaesthetics

Women and children 
 Women's ward and birthing suite
 Children's ward
 Special care nursery
 Women's health clinics
 Obstetrics and gynaecology
 Paediatrics

Mental health 
Psychiatry
 Geriatric psychiatry
 CATT - Crisis Assessment and Treatment Team
 Community mental health

Miscellaneous 
 Emergency department
 Intensive care unit
 Primary care centre
 Radiology 
 Pathology
 Research
 Dental health 
 Allied health

See also 
List of hospitals in Australia

References

External links

Hospitals in Victoria (Australia)
Buildings and structures in Bendigo
Hospitals established in 1853
1853 establishments in Australia
Bendigo